Arnd Neuhaus (born 26 September 1967) is a German basketball player. He competed in the men's tournament at the 1992 Summer Olympics.

References

External links
 

1967 births
Living people
German men's basketball players
Olympic basketball players of Germany
Basketball players at the 1992 Summer Olympics
Sportspeople from Hagen
1994 FIBA World Championship players